Hayrick Butte is a tuya, a  type of subglacial volcano, in Linn County, Oregon. Located in the Willamette National Forest near Santiam Pass, it lies adjacent to the cinder cone Hoodoo Butte, which has a ski area. Hayrick Butte likely formed when lava erupted underneath an overlying glacier or ice sheet, producing the flat top with near-vertical walls along the ice-contact margin as the lava cooled and hardened. A cartographer accidentally switched the names for nearby Hoodoo Butte and Hayrick Butte; the word "hoodoo" usually refers to rock piles and pinnacles like those observed at Hayrick Butte.

Compared to Hoodoo, Hayrick is less popular for recreation, though it can be climbed, and there are hiking, snowshoeing, and snowmobile routes surrounding the butte. Its north-facing slope has subalpine forests with mountain hemlock and fir, which are common in the Cascades.

Geography
Hayrick Butte is located in Linn County in the U. S. state of Oregon. Close to Santiam Pass, it forms part of the United States Geological Survey topographic map for the Three Fingered Jack volcano. Hayrick Butte lies south of Three Fingered Jack near Hoodoo Butte, Sand Mountain Field, Potato Butte, and Black Butte, with Belknap Crater and Mount Washington further to the south. It is also within the McKenzie Ranger District of the Willamette National Forest.

Hayrick Butte is located next to the Hoodoo ski area. In response to a new master plan at the Hoodoo Ski Bowl in 1995, the United States Forest Service released a draft environmental impact statement for the surroundings. The Forest Service argued that development at Hoodoo Butte and Hayrick Butte would require excavating and/or blasting  of soil and rock on Hayrick Butte, which would potentially exacerbate erosion of local soil. The removal of this soil and rock would also substantially limit future revegetation, further reducing soil productivity in the area. The Forest Service statement also asserted that development of new trails would not lead to significant "scenic resource effects," and that any "landform modification" from a proposed snow play area would only have moderate and short-term effects.

Ecology
The Oregon Department of Fish and Wildlife determined in the early 1990s that there was potential for peregrine falcon nests at Hayrick Butte, though it was considered low-quality habitat because of its lack of suitable ledges and high amounts of human disturbance. Dense forests are less common at higher elevations, switching to patchy forest stands separated from each other by shrubs or meadows.

Geology
North Sister (of the Three Sisters volcano complex) and Mount Washington mark isolated volcanic centers among the highly mafic (rich in magnesium and iron) platform of the central High Cascade arc. About 4.5 million years ago, eruption of mafic lava filled a subsiding Pliocene depression, creating the modern, mafic High Cascades. Compared to the eruptive products at and near North Sister, lava deposits at Mount Washington have a greater abundance of incompatible elements (elements unsuitable in size and/or charge to the cation sites of the minerals of which it is included.) The nearby lava dome and tuya (subglacial volcano) Hogg Rock shows more similarity to the basaltic andesite deposits at North Sister, which are poorly enriched in incompatible elements. The part of the High Cascades that extends south from Mount Jefferson to Santiam Pass includes shield volcanoes, lava domes, and cinder cones. The high elevation of Matuyama-aged rocks east of Santiam Pass, coupled with exposure of Brunhes-aged rocks to the west, imply the presence of a northward-trending normal fault.

Hayrick Butte is of late Pleistocene age. Like Hogg Rock, Hayrick Butte is an andesite lava dome with a flat top, suggesting that it is also a tuya, or a subglacial volcano. Both volcanic features have been eroded by glaciation, leaving glassy margins and jointing. Both Hayrick Butte and Hogg Rock produced porphyritic andesite lava with plagioclase and orthopyroxene and trace levels of phenocrysts with olivine. Hayrick Butte also served as a barrier for Hoodoo Butte during the Pleistocene glaciation, blocking the advancement of glacial ice from eroding Hoodoo's summit crater.

Most lava domes in the Cascades occur in clusters or surrounding just a few major volcanic centers. There are roughly 190 known domes in the state of Oregon, with 40 located near Mount Jefferson, 22 near the Tumalo volcanic highland, 28 near the Three Sisters, and close to 60 surrounding Mount Mazama. Hayrick Butte, however, is more isolated from other volcanoes. Hildreth (2007) likewise writes that Hayrick is "clearly separated from major clusters or evolved centers."

Hayrick Butte has a normal magnetic polarity. Like Hogg Rock and other andesite lava domes in the area, it has lower incompatible element abundances than surrounding andesitic rock deposits. A 1992 element abundance analysis of Hayrick Butte andesite samples from the margin of the volcano shows a silicon dioxide (silica) level of 60.1 percent, aluminum oxide level of 18.4 percent, calcium oxide level of 6.24 percent, iron(II) oxide level of 5.55 percent, and sodium oxide level of 4.42 percent. Magnesium oxide made up 3.3 percent of the samples, with potassium oxide levels at 1.08 percent and manganese(II) oxide, phosphorus pentoxide, and titanium dioxide all below 1 percent. Additional studies from 1980 and 1983 exhibit similar levels of silica in samples from Hogg Rock and Hayrick Butte at about 59 to 60 percent.

Human history
According to cartographer Stuart Allen, an early cartographer accidentally switched the names for nearby Hoodoo Butte and Hayrick Butte. The word "hoodoo" refers to rock piles and pinnacles like those observed at Hayrick Butte, while "hayrick" is a synonym for haystack, a more fitting name for Hoodoo Butte, which has a profile that resembles a haystack shape. Whether or not this error actually occurred remains unclear, but the names remain to present day.

Recreation
The Obsidian Climb School and Eugene Mountain Rescue offer climbing classes and field sessions at Hayrick Butte. The route travels between Hayrick and Hoodoo Butte, offering views of Mount Washington. There is an avalanche hazard near Hayrick's base. An old roadbed next to the trail travels up Hoodoo Butte to the Hoodoo Butte Plateau and the butte's summit, where a historic fire cleared many trees. There are snowmobile routes down the old Santiam Pass Wagon Road to the south and Forest Road 2690 to the east, as well as a geocache at Hayrick's summit. The tuya is also surrounded by cliffs. William Sullivan of The Register-Guard wrote that Hayrick offered "breathtaking views" of Mount Jefferson, Big Lake, Hoodoo Butte, Mount Washington, and Black Butte. Hayrick Butte is also visible from the  Patjens Lake Loop trail near Santiam Pass.

References

Sources

 
 .
 .
.
 
 
 .
 
 .
 
 .
 
 
 .
 .
 .

External links

Buttes of Oregon
Cascade Range
Cascade Volcanoes
Mountains of Linn County, Oregon
Mountains of Oregon
Subduction volcanoes
Tuyas of the United States
Volcanoes of Linn County, Oregon
Volcanoes of Oregon